Work with Me is an American sitcom television series starring Kevin Pollak and Nancy Travis as two attorneys who are married and work together in Manhattan. The series premiered September 29, 1999, on CBS until October 20, 1999. Due to low ratings, the show was cancelled after four episodes.

Characters
 Jordan Better (Kevin Pollak)
 Julie Better (Nancy Travis)
 Sebastian (Ethan Embry)
 Stacy (Emily Rutherfurd)
 A.J. (Bray Poor)
 Murray Epstein (Ted McGinley)
 Cashman (William Bogert)
 Sullivan (Harrison Young)

Reception
Howard Rosenberg of the Los Angeles Times stated that the series is "forgettable, nothing really to like or dislike about mundane marrieds Julie and Jordan Better in a debut that offers no compelling reason to tune in again".

Episodes

References

External links

1990s American sitcoms
1999 American television series debuts
1999 American television series endings
CBS original programming
Television series by CBS Studios
Television series by Universal Television
English-language television shows
Television shows set in New York City